An Independent Company was originally a unit raised by the English Army, subsequently the British Army, during the 17th and 18th Centuries for garrison duties in Britain and the overseas colonies. These units were not part of larger battalions or regiments (although they may have originally been detached from them), and would remain permanently assigned to the garrison.

In the Twentieth Century the name was used for a temporary expeditionary formation of the British Army during the Second World War. Initially there were ten Independent Companies, who were raised from volunteers from Territorial Army divisions in April 1940. They were intended for guerrilla-style operations in the Allied campaign in Norway. The companies were disbanded after returning to Britain at the end of the campaign but No. 11 Company was formed from volunteers from the first ten Independent Companies on 14 June 1940 and took part in the first British commando raid, Operation Collar.

Origins
Early in 1940, the British Army had been making plans for a campaign in Norway, ostensibly to support Finland in the Winter War against Russia, who then had a pact of alliance with Germany. When the Finns capitulated on 12 March 1940, the troops assigned to the operation were instead sent to France. Nevertheless, contingency planning continued. As part of this, MI(R), a department of the War Office responsible for irregular operations, was asked to plan for raids on the Norwegian coast. The department's head, Colonel J.C.F Holland, summoned Lieutenant Colonel Colin Gubbins, leading MI(R)'s mission in Paris, to prepare and train the troops.

On 9 April, the Germans launched Operation Weserübung, occupying Oslo and Narvik and several other ports in Norway, taking the allies by surprise. On 13 April, Holland submitted MI(R)'s first proposals to the War Office. He intended to break up the Lovat Scouts to form the raiding parties. However, the Scouts' commanding officer (Lieutenant Colonel Leslie Melville) objected, and instead Holland proposed to form the Independent Companies.

Companies
Ten companies were formed from volunteers from Territorial Army divisions still stationed in Great Britain:
 No. 1 Independent Company formed from 52nd (Lowland) Infantry Division
 No. 2 Independent Company formed from 53rd (Welsh) Infantry Division
 No. 3 Independent Company formed from 54th (East Anglian) Infantry Division
 No. 4 Independent Company formed from 55th (West Lancashire) Motor Division
 No. 5 Independent Company formed from 1st (London) Division
 No. 6 Independent Company formed from 9th (Highland) Infantry Division
 No. 7 Independent Company formed from 15th (Scottish) Infantry Division
 No. 8 Independent Company formed from 18th (East Anglian) Infantry Division
 No. 9 Independent Company formed from 38th (Welsh) Infantry Division
 No. 10 Independent Company formed from 66th Infantry Division

The establishment of each company was 21 officers and 268 other ranks, organised as three platoons, each of three sections. Some personnel from the Royal Engineers and Royal Signals were attached to each company headquarters. As the companies were intended to be mobile in rough terrain and to operate independently for several days, they were lightly equipped. Each company's only heavy weapons were Bren light machine guns, a single Boys anti-tank rifle and some 2-inch mortars in a Support section. The companies therefore were unsuitable for holding fixed defences or mounting rearguard actions.

Gubbins realised that the soldiers and junior officers of the newly raised companies were untrained in mountain and irregular warfare. He therefore requested that twenty picked officers of the Indian Army, with experience of the North-West Frontier, be attached to the Independent Companies. The selected officers flew from Karachi to Britain aboard the Imperial Airways flying boat Cathay.

Norwegian Campaign

Formal approval for the establishment of the Independent Companies was given only on 20 April. No. 1 Independent Company nevertheless first embarked for Norway on 27 April.

On 2 May, Gubbins was given command of "Scissorsforce", consisting of Nos. 1, 3, 4, and 5 Independent Companies, and ordered to prevent the Germans occupying Bodø, Mo and Mosjøen. Part of the force (Nos. 4 and 5 Independent Companies) arrived at Mosjøen on 8 May. Early on 10 May, they successfully ambushed the leading Germans advancing on Mosjøen from the south, but were harassed by Luftwaffe aircraft during the long daylight hours and were outmatched by the main body of German Gebirgsjäger (mountain troops). Exhausted, they were withdrawn by a Norwegian coaster to Bodø on 11 May.

On 10 May also, 300 Gebirgsjäger with two mountain guns disembarked from the commandeered coaster  at Hemnesberget, roughly midway between Mosjøen and Mo. A platoon of No. 1 Independent Company and some Norwegian reservists defending the town were outnumbered and forced to escape by boat after a stiff resistance. No. 1 Independent Company and some Norwegian troops attacked the next day but failed to dislodge the Germans, who had been reinforced and resupplied by seaplanes.

Gubbins's force was then placed under the command of 24th (Guards) Brigade at Bodø. The destroyer carrying the brigade's commander (Brigadier William Fraser) was put out of action by the Luftwaffe, and Gubbins assumed command of the brigade. Nos. 1 and 3 Independent Companies of the former "Scissorsforce", reinforced by No. 2 Independent Company which had recently landed at Bodø, thereafter generally fought in rearguard actions while attached to the brigade's infantry units in several actions in Nordland, until all British troops were withdrawn from Bodø in the early hours of 1 June.

Aftermath
The ten Independent Companies were disbanded after the Norwegian campaign. While most of their men were returned to their parent units and formations, calls were being made throughout the Army for men to join the new Commando units. Those men from the Independent Companies who volunteered were formed on 14 June into No. 11 Independent Company, with an establishment of 25 officers and 350 other ranks. The Company took part in Operation Collar, a raid on the Pas de Calais on 24 June. They also participated in Operation Ambassador in conjunction with No. 3 Commando, in which it was planned that the Company would attack an airfield on the German-occupied Channel Island of Guernsey, while the Commando secured the landing beach and created a diversion. After a postponement the raid commenced on 14/15 July 1940, but faulty compasses on their launches meant that only one boat-load from the Company actually landed, but on the wrong island, Little Sark, where there were no Germans. No. 11 Independent Company was disbanded shortly afterwards and its remaining personnel were incorporated into the new Commando units. Gubbins returned to MI(R) and eventually became the director of the Special Operations Executive. Lieutenant Colonel Hugh Stockwell, who had commanded No. 2 Independent Company in Norway, set up the Commando training centre at Lochailort, before enjoying a distinguished record as a brigade and division commander.

See also
 Independent Highland Companies
  British Army Independent Companies in South Carolina
 Independent companies (Australian)
 Norwegian Independent Company 1
 Special Service Brigade

References

Sources
 
 
 
 
 

Commandos (United Kingdom)
20th-century history of the British Army
Military units and formations of the British Army in World War II
Military units and formations established in 1940
1940 establishments in the United Kingdom
Norwegian campaign